Nirmal Kumar Ganguly (born 1941)  is an Indian microbiologist specialising in tropical diseases, cardiovascular diseases and diarrhea.

Education 
Ganguly is a graduate of R. G. Kar Medical College, then affiliated with the University of Calcutta. He did his MD in Microbiology from Post Graduate Institute of Medical Education and Research where he also served as Acting Director.

Career 
Ganguly has been Emeritus Professor of Post Graduate Institute of Medical Education and Research and was Director General, Indian Council of Medical Research, New Delhi (1998-2007). An elected fellow of the National Academy of Medical Sciences, he is currently President of the Jawaharlal Institute of Postgraduate Medical Education and Research.

Awards and honours
He was awarded the Padma Bhushan in 2009.

References 

1941 births
Living people
Indian biochemists
Scientists from Kolkata
University of Calcutta alumni
Recipients of the Padma Bhushan in medicine
Date of birth missing (living people)
Fellows of the National Academy of Medical Sciences
20th-century Indian biologists